Andrew John Bethel (born 18 July 1967) is an English cricketer.  Bethel is a left-handed batsman who bowls right-arm off break.  He was born in Sheffield, Yorkshire.

Bethel represented the Yorkshire Cricket Board in List A cricket.  His debut List A match came against the Gloucestershire Cricket Board in the 1999 NatWest Trophy.  From 1999 to 2002, he represented the Board in 10 List A matches, the last of which came against Northumberland in the 2nd round of the 2003 Cheltenham & Gloucester Trophy which was played in 2002.  In his 10 List A matches, he scored 143 runs at a batting average of 14.30, with a high score of 38.  In the field he took 2 catches.

He currently plays club cricket for Whitley Hall Cricket Club.

References

External links
Andrew Bethel at Cricinfo

1967 births
Living people
Cricketers from Sheffield
English cricketers
Yorkshire Cricket Board cricketers
English cricketers of 1969 to 2000
English cricketers of the 21st century